is a tokusatsu superhero television series and weekly science fiction manga created by manga artist Shotaro Ishinomori. The original airing consisted of a total of 98 episodes and were broadcast from April 3, 1971, to February 10, 1973, on Mainichi Broadcasting System and NET (now TV Asahi). The manga adaptation was also featured in Shōnen Magazine around the same period. The series has evolved into a franchise with many subsequent annual iterations.

Story 
The series takes place in a world plagued by Shocker, a mysterious worldwide terrorist organization formed by remaining members of the Nazis. To further its plans for world domination, Shocker recruited its agents through kidnapping, turning their victims into mutant cyborgs and, ultimately, brainwashing them. However, one victim named Takeshi Hongo escaped just before the final brainwashing. With his sanity and moral conscience intact, Takeshi wages a one-man war against Shocker's minions as the grasshopper-themed  superhero Kamen Rider. Another victim of the cyborg process, freelance photographer Hayato Ichimonji, became Kamen Rider 2 after Kamen Rider, who eventually renamed himself "Kamen Rider 1", saved him from Shocker's brainwashing. Assisted by motorcycle race team manager Tobei Tachibana and FBI agent Kazuya Taki, the Kamen Riders fought in both solo and partnered missions against Shocker while later getting help from Tobei and Kazuya's Kamen Rider Kid Corps. Later, after many battles with Shocker the organization was wiped out and its leader created Gel-Shocker to fulfill his goals. After many battles with Gel-Shocker the Kamen Riders defeated the organization's leader and stopped Gel-Shocker. With Kazuya returning to America peace was restored, or so it seems.

Manga
Many manga based on the original Kamen Rider series have been published, but only one was penned and drawn by Ishinomori himself. Ishinomori was also the author of one chapter of the Kamen Rider Amazon manga and the entire Kamen Rider Black manga.  However, those manga were based on sequels to Kamen Rider, rather than the original series.

The original manga, published in 1971, initially follows a path resembling the first few episodes of the TV series, from basic plot to creature designs. However, when Takeshi leaves the story, the series diverge greatly. In the TV show, Takeshi travels abroad to fight Shocker in other countries, leaving Japan's protection to Hayato Ichimonji, a freelance cameraman who was experimented on by Shocker but saved by Takeshi, becoming the second Kamen Rider. In the manga, Takeshi never left Japan. He was confronted by twelve "Shocker Riders" and was subsequently mortally wounded during his battle against them. Hayato Ichimonji, one of the twelve Shocker Riders, receives a head injury during the fight and regains his conscience as a result. He then turns against Shocker and takes Takeshi's role as Kamen Rider. In spite of the damage to his body, Takeshi's brain survives and guides Hayato, the two fighting as one.

Takeshi eventually returns as a Rider in both stories, but starting with Hayato's debut, villains and even basic story development greatly diverge between the two versions. The manga portrays a seemingly hopeless battle against Shocker, an organization with ties to governmental conspiracies that seems much bigger than either of the two Riders. The live action TV shows portray the Riders as heroes strong enough to bring down Shocker, only to see it replaced by similar organizations led by Shocker's mysterious leader. The Shocker Riders eventually appear in the TV series, too, but they looked different and had different abilities. There were also only six Shocker Riders, rather than the manga's 12.

In February 2021, Seven Seas Entertainment announced they licensed the original manga for publication in one omnibus edition.

Characters

Kamen Riders
: The first main protagonist. A biochemistry lab student at Jonan University who also races motorcycles as part of the Tachibana Racing Club.
: The other main protagonist. A freelance photographer who becomes the second Kamen Rider after Takeshi saves him from Shocker.

Allies

: Takeshi's racing mentor and confidant. He is often called "Boss" by other members of his racing club. He runs a small café named Snack Amigo where Hongo and other members of Tachibana's racing club gather in early episodes, and its employees occasionally assist Hongo in countering Shocker's plans. At the same time as Takeshi's departure, he opens a motorcycle goods shop named Tachibana Auto Corner and sets up the Tachibana Racing Club. He is often seen smoking a pipe.
: An FBI agent assigned to investigate Shocker activities in Japan. While not himself a cyborg, Kazuya was skilled in martial arts and often used them alongside both Kamen Riders to battle the combatants who invariably accompanied a Shocker commander.
: Takeshi's teacher at university and an authority on biochemistry. He is a Shocker scientist, but freed Takeshi and was killed by Spider Man, an agent of Shocker.
: The daughter of Doctor Midorikawa, she initially blames Takeshi for her father's death, but eventually learns the truth and becomes his ally. In episode 14, it is revealed that she accompanied Takeshi on his quest to defeat Shocker activities in Europe.
: Ruriko's fellow student, who works as a waitress at Snack Amigo.
: A bartender at Snack Amigo.
: Female members of the Tachibana Racing Club who assist both Kamen Riders.
: Hiromi's friend, who is a first-degree black belt in karate.
: Hiromi's friend, who has experience in fencing.
: Hiromi's friend, who has experience in aikido and is a small-displacement rider.
: Takeshi's assistant from Switzerland, who has experience in aikido.
: Takeshi's assistant from Switzerland, who is good at fortune-telling by playing cards.
: She is in charge of cooking in the Tachibana Racing Club.
: After the Kamen Rider Kid Corps was set up, she was in charge of communication and administration.
: She likes food.
: A bright boy who frequents the Tachibana Racing Club.
: A nationwide organization, with Tobei as the president and Kazuya as the captain, that is composed of boys and girls in episode 74.
: Boys who serve as leading members.

Shocker
 is a terrorist organization formed by former Nazis. Shocker's goal is to conquer the world. To this end, their scientists turn humans into superhuman cyborgs by surgically altering them with animal and insect DNA with robotic cybernetics. Virtually all of its members are modified the same way. Even a Shocker Combatant is tougher, faster, and stronger than an ordinary human civilian. The original manga showed that Shocker had influence over the governments of the world. Its founders had ties to the Nazis, Illuminati and the Kamen Rider Spirits manga makes references to the group's support by the Badan Empire.

Ruthless and merciless, Shocker would often kidnap prominent scientists and force them to work for the organization, then kill them when their usefulness was at an end, or if they attempted to escape. The decision to kidnap and modify college student Takeshi Hongo proved to be their undoing. He was intended to be another of Shocker's powerful cyborg warriors, a grasshopper-human hybrid, but he escaped and opposed them as Kamen Rider 1. A later attempt to create a second, more powerful Kamen Rider backfired when the intended victim, Hayato Ichimonji, was rescued by the original Rider before he was brainwashed. Hayato joined Takeshi as Kamen Rider 2. The pair, known as the Double Riders, put an end to Shocker, and later its remnants, who formed Gelshocker after their disbandment.

In OOO, Den-O, All Riders: Let's Go Kamen Riders, Shocker, although with a membership and leadership covering Gelshocker members from the original TV series, obtained a Core Medal and modified it into the Shocker Medal. Though they were originally unable to use it, the appearance of the Greed Ankh in their time enabled the organization to obtain one of his Cell Medals and create the Shocker Greed. This altered time so that Shocker defeated the Double Riders and managed to conquer all of Japan and eventually the world, setting up a union with many of the other organizations that originally emerged after Shocker's destruction. The group is ultimately defeated by the Kamen Riders.

But as revealed in Kamen Rider OOO onwards, there are some surviving members of the Shocker organization, even from Badan Empire who went into hiding to gather data of the Kamen Riders' battles against some of their respective monsters many years ago. But during the events of Superhero Taisen GP: Kamen Rider 3, Shocker's remaining scientists created a History Modification Machine that they use to send a time displaced cyborg called Kamen Rider Three back in time to destroy the Double Riders in the aftermath of Gelshocker's defeat, creating a new timeline where Shocker rules the world with some Kamen Riders in their service. Luckily, the apparent destruction of the History Modification Machine restores the timeline (with the exception of Go Shijima/Kamen Rider Mach who was killed by Cheetahkatatsumuri), only to be found out during the events of D-Video Special: Kamen Rider Four that Shocker secretly uses it to create time loops and alters the timeline once more, allowing to create Kamen Rider Four, as well as  the revelation that they have been targeting Takumi Inui, due to his sacrifice-less wish to ensure that no one dies like what happened to one of his old allies to create a loop. As Takumi is about to destroy the machine, the Shocker Leader appears with an appearance identical to Takumi's. In the end, Takumi destroys the machine and disappears alongside the modified timeline, restored back to its original timeline once more. Though most of his allies who do not originate from the Kamen Rider 555 TV series like from Kamen Rider Drive, and even Kamen Rider Den-O'''s Kamen Rider Zeronos don't remember if they had encountered Takumi, only some of Takumi's old friends from the Kamen Rider 555 TV series, including Naoya Kaido still remember Takumi.

In the movie Kamen Rider 1, there is a civil war between the original Shocker and a newly formed organization called Nova Shocker in an attempt to kidnap Mayu, Tobei Tachibana's granddaughter, and release the Alexander Gamma Eyecon from her body, in order to obtain its power. As all of the revived the Ambassador from Hell's Shocker faction had been annihilated completely, leaving only himself, and also after he witnessed how dangerous the Alexander Gamma Eyecon is, he makes an uneasy alliance with Kamen Riders Ghost, Specter and a newly improved Kamen Rider 1.
 : The high ruler of the organization and main antagonist of the series. He appears for the first time in short video footage shown in episode 34, although his appearance there is mostly hidden by shadows. He talks with his followers through speakers on Shocker's emblems in the multiple outposts. The Shocker Leader is a cruel being who does not have qualms in sacrificing his minions during moments of crisis or failure.
  (a.k.a. ): From Shocker's Near and Middle East Branch, his true form was a wolflike monster. He was also a disguise specialist, able to mimic Taki's appearance almost perfectly using only makeup during his debut. His personal mark, worn by the Combatants of his own Shocker outpost and used in his official correspondence, was the Shocker emblem, but with the bird's head replaced by a wolf's. He confronted Kamen Rider 2 himself in episode 39 and after a lengthy fight was toppled off a cliff by Kamen Rider 2's Rider Punch, destroying him. Gold Wolf-Man briefly appeared in Kamen Rider vs Shocker among the members of the resurrected monster army. In Kamen Rider V3, episode 27, Colonel Zol is resurrected alongside the other three great Shocker and Gelshocker commanders from the original TV series by Destron. He aims to become a Destron commander, replacing Doctor G. However, in episode 28, after Kamen Rider V3 escaped from Destron's base, a self-destruction sequence was activated, and Colonel Zol was unable to escape, dying again with it. In the Kamen Rider Spirits manga, he is revived with other Shocker commanders as a soulless pawn of the Badan Empire.
 : From Shocker's branch in Switzerland, he took over Japan's command after Zol's death until the Ambassador from Hell appeared. However, he returned to Japan in episode 61, working together with the Ambassador from Hell and also attempting his own plans. He had cold and calculating behavior. In episode 68, he captured Tobei to help train him for his battle with Kamen Rider 1, but that only resulted in Tobei learning about his weak point, his head. Discarding his cape when he faced Takeshi for the last time, Death assumed his squidlike monster form to fight Rider 1 with his tentacle whip, while Taki was held off by the Shocker Combatants. With Tobei's guidance, Kamen Rider 1 managed to overpower Ikadevil and weaken him with a Rider Chop before sending Squiddevil falling to his death with his Rider Drill Shoot. Ikadevil tried to rise once more, only to fall down and explode. Doctor Death was resurrected by Destron in Kamen Rider V3, episode 27, and speculated about how he had been brought back to replace Doctor G, only to learn that he was there just for a new operation. Shortly afterwards, in episode 28, he died when Destron's base accidentally self-destructed. He is revived as a soulless pawn of the Badan Empire alongside Colonel Zol and the Ambassador from Hell in the Kamen Rider Spirits manga.
 : Summoned from Shocker's branch in Southeast Asia, he took command of the organization in Japan. His true name was  according to Kamen Rider Spirits. He used an electromagnetic whip and an iron claw as his weapons. In episode 79, after capturing the Riders' friends, he called Hongo out as he assumed his rattlesnake-like monster form, able to burrow underground and use his whip arm as a weapon. Kamen Rider 1 battled Garagaranda while Kazuya freed Tobei and the others, managing to use his Rider Kick on the monster. Reverting to his normal form, Hell cursed the Riders and screamed to Shocker's perseverance before he died, exploding. Afterwards, the Shocker Leader destroyed the original Shocker. In spite of his failure, the Ambassador from Hell was resurrected by Destron in Kamen Rider V3, episode 27. In episode 28, his sneaky behavior ended up leading to the prisoner V3 capturing him and escaping from the Destron base. Soon afterwards, the Ambassador from Hell returned to the base, only to die in its self-destruction. the Ambassador from Hell returns in the Kamen Rider Spirits manga, working for the Badan Empire. But his difference among the other revived members is that he had his own consciousness, and it is revealed that the Silver Skull used to revive him is capable of bringing back the dead person's memories. In Kamen Rider ZX, the Ambassador of Darkness, the Ambassador from Hell's younger cousin, appeared as a Badan Empire leader.
 : Black uniformed soldiers, some of the later versions having skeleton markings on their torsos. They are normally easily defeated by the Riders, often without even needing to transform. Their trademark is a high-pitched battle-cry.
: A character who only appears in Ishinomori's original Kamen Rider manga. Big Machine is Shocker's highest commander and main antagonist in the manga. He also seems to be the one called "Shocker Leader" by some of the lower ranking Shocker members. He has a fully mechanized body and is behind Shocker's "October Project", which involves using a supercomputer to brainwash the population of Japan. He's able to match up the Riders in combat and launch attacks that disrupt electronic equipment, including Rider 1's and 2's own bodies. The design of his body was the base of the Ambassador from Hell's design in the TV show, although it was altered to allow a human face and, unlike Big Machine, the Ambassador from Hell was kept a separate character from the Shocker Leader. In Kamen Rider × Super Sentai: Superhero Taisen, Big Machine is reimagined as a project of the Shocker/Zangyack Alliance to create a giant robot from the Crisis Fortress and the Gigant Horse.

Gel Shocker
 was formed after the disbandment of Shocker, with the remnants of the organization absorbing another organization  trained in the deserts of Africa. After Ambassador Hell's defeat, the Shocker Leader reorganized the organization from the ground up, destroying all remaining secret bases and even killing the remaining troop contingent in a bloody forest massacre witnessed by unfortunate campers. Gel Shocker Combatants wore bright purple and yellow costumes, were capable of traveling from one place to another by transforming into sheets that would drop down onto unsuspecting victims, and were capable of taking more blunt abuse than their predecessors.

Later, he fought the Double Riders on a roller coaster and was defeated by their Rider Double Chop while turning invisible. Weakened, he reverted to his human form and cursed the Double Riders before exploding. Eventually, General Black was resurrected and worked for Destron in an important operation but ended up dying in the self-destruction of a Destron base. Black returned as a soulless pawn of the Badan Empire in the Kamen Rider Spirits manga, but he was defeated by a Rider Double Kick performed by Kamen Riders 2 and ZX.

Episode list
  (Original Airdate: April 3, 1971)
  (Original Airdate: April 10, 1971)
  (Original Airdate: April 17, 1971)
  (Original Airdate: April 24, 1971)
  (Original Airdate: May 1, 1971)
  (Original Airdate: May 8, 1971)
  (Original Airdate: May 15, 1971)
  (Original Airdate: May 22, 1971)
  (Original Airdate: May 29, 1971)
  (Original Airdate: June 5, 1971)
  (Original Airdate: June 12, 1971)
  (Original Airdate: June 19, 1971)
  (Original Airdate: June 26, 1971)
  (Original Airdate: July 3, 1971)
  (Original Airdate: July 10, 1971)
  (Original Airdate: July 17, 1971)
  (Original Airdate: July 24, 1971)
  (Original Airdate: July 31, 1971)
  (Original Airdate: August 7, 1971)
  (Original Airdate: August 14, 1971)
  (Original Airdate: August 21, 1971)
  (Original Airdate: August 28, 1971)
  (Original Airdate: September 4, 1971)
  (Original Airdate: September 11, 1971)
  (Original Airdate: September 18, 1971)
  (Original Airdate: September 25, 1971)
  (Original Airdate: October 2, 1971)
  (Original Airdate: October 9, 1971)
  (Original Airdate: October 16, 1971)
  (Original Airdate: October 23, 1971)
  (Original Airdate: October 30, 1971)
  (Original Airdate: November 6, 1971)
  (Original Airdate: November 13, 1971)
  (Original Airdate: November 20, 1971)
  (Original Airdate: November 27, 1971)
  (Original Airdate: December 4, 1971)
  (Original Airdate: December 11, 1971)
  (Original Airdate: December 18, 1971)
  (Original Airdate: December 25, 1971)
  (Original Airdate: January 1, 1972)
  (Original Airdate: January 8, 1972)
  (Original Airdate: January 15, 1972)
  (Original Airdate: January 22, 1972)
  (Original Airdate: January 29, 1972)
  (Original Airdate: February 5, 1972)
  (Original Airdate: February 12, 1972)
  (Original Airdate: February 19, 1972)
  (Original Airdate: February 26, 1972)
  (Original Airdate: March 4, 1972)
  (Original Airdate: March 11, 1972)
  (Original Airdate: March 18, 1972)
  (Original Airdate: March 25, 1972)
  (Original Airdate: April 1, 1972)
  (Original Airdate: April 8, 1972)
  (Original Airdate: April 15, 1972)
  (Original Airdate: April 22, 1972)
  (Original Airdate: April 29, 1972)
  (Original Airdate: May 6, 1972)
  (Original Airdate: May 13, 1972)
  (Original Airdate: May 20, 1972)
  (Original Airdate: May 27, 1972)
  (Original Airdate: June 3, 1972)
  (Original Airdate: June 10, 1972)
  (Original Airdate: June 17, 1972)
  (Original Airdate: June 24, 1972)
  (Original Airdate: July 1, 1972)
  (Original Airdate: July 8, 1972)
  (Original Airdate: July 15, 1972)
  (Original Airdate: July 22, 1972)
  (Original Airdate: July 29, 1972)
  (Original Airdate: August 5, 1972)
  (Original Airdate: August 12, 1972)
  (Original Airdate: August 19, 1972)
  (Original Airdate: August 26, 1972)
  (Original Airdate: September 2, 1972)
  (Original Airdate: September 9, 1972)
  (Original Airdate: September 16, 1972)
  (Original Airdate: September 23, 1972)
  (Original Airdate: September 30, 1972)
  (Original Airdate: October 7, 1972)
  (Original Airdate: October 14, 1972)
  (Original Airdate: October 21, 1972)
  (Original Airdate: October 28, 1972)
  (Original Airdate: November 4, 1972)
  (Original Airdate: November 11, 1972)
  (Original Airdate: November 18, 1972)
  (Original Airdate: November 25, 1972)
  (Original Airdate: December 2, 1972)
  (Original Airdate: December 9, 1972)
  (Original Airdate: December 16, 1972)
  (Original Airdate: December 23, 1972)
  (Original Airdate: December 30, 1972)
  (Original Airdate: January 6, 1973)
  (Original Airdate: January 13, 1973)
  (Original Airdate: January 20, 1973)
  (Original Airdate: January 27, 1973)
  (Original Airdate: February 3, 1973)
  (Original Airdate: February 10, 1973)

Films
 1971:  - A movie version of episode 13.
 1972: 
 1972: 
 1975: 
 2005: Kamen Rider: The First 2007: Kamen Rider: The Next 2011: 
 2014: 
 2016: 
 2021: 
 2021: 
 2023: Shin Kamen RiderS.I.C. Hero Saga
Published in Monthly Hobby Japan, the S.I.C. Hero Saga stories illustrated by S.I.C. figure dioramas portray stories featuring the characters from the Shotaro Ishinomori series. Missing Link ran in the July to October 2002 issues, From Here to Eternity was featured in the special issue HOBBY JAPAN MOOK S.I.C. OFFICIAL DIORAMA STORY S.I.C. HERO SAGA vol.1 Kakioroshi, and Special Episode: Escape was featured in the October 2006 issue of Hobby Japan.

New characters introduced during the Missing Link story are the twelve  and the .Missing Link chapter titles

Cast
Takeshi Hongo: 
Hayato Ichimonji: 
Kazuya Taki: 
Tōbei Tachibana: 
Ruriko Midorikawa: 
Hiromi Nohara: 
Shiro: 
Yuri: 
Mari: 
Michi: 
Goro Ishikura: 
Emi: 
Mika: 
Tokko: 
Naoki: 
Mitsuru: 
Yokko: 
Choko: 
Colonel Zol: 
Doctor Death: 
Ambassador Hell: 
General Black: 
Shocker/Gelshocker Leader (Voice): 
Narration: 

Staff
Creator: Shotaro Ishinomori
Scriptwriters: Masaru Igami, Shinichi Ichikawa, Masayuki Shimada, Mari Takizawa, Hisashi Yamazaki, Takao Nagaishi, Masahiro Tsukada, Ikurō Suzuki, Takeo Ōno, Fumio Ishimori, Kimiyuki Hasegawa, Kimio Hirayama, Minoru Yamada, Gorō Oketani, Shotaro Ishinomori
Directors: Kōichi Takemoto, Itaru Orita, Hidetoshi Kitamura, Minoru Yamada, Issaku Uchida, Katsuhiko Taguchi, Masahiro Tsukada, Shotaro Ishinomori, Atsuo Okunaka
Music: Shunsuke Kikuchi

Songs
Opening themes

Lyrics: Shotaro Ishinomori
Composition & Arrangement: Shunsuke Kikuchi
Artist: Hiroshi Fujioka / Masato Shimon (as Koichi Fuji) & 
Episodes: 1 - 13 (Fujioka), 14 - 88 (Fuji) 

Lyrics: Shotaro Ishinomori
Composition & Arrangement: Shunsuke Kikuchi
Artist: Masato Shimon
Episodes: 89 – 98

Ending themes

Lyrics: Saburō Yatsude
Composition & Arrangement: Shunsuke Kikuchi
Artist: Koichi Fuji, Male Harmony
Episodes: 1 – 71
"Rider Action"
Lyrics: Shotaro Ishinomori
Composition & Arrangement: Shunsuke Kikuchi
Artist: Masato Shimon
Episodes: 72 – 88

Lyrics: Mamoru Tanaka
Composition & Arrangement: Shunsuke Kikuchi
Artist: Masato Shimon
Episodes: 89 – 98

Legacy
The Kamen Rider original series famously spearheaded launched the "Second Kaiju Boom" or "Henshin Boom" on Japanese television in the early 1970s, greatly impacting the superhero and action-adventure genre in Japan. The famous "henshin sequence", in which the title hero performs ritualistic poses and shouting a keyword to transform into his superhero form has since become a staple in Japanese pop-culture, inspiring superheroes, and magical girl genres. Kamen Rider went later produce a great number of spin-offs which remain in production today. Several Kamen Rider series were aired in Japan after the first Kamen Rider finished. After Kamen Rider Black RX ended production in 1989, the series was put on hold.

There were three movies released as the 1990s "Movie Riders", which were Shin Kamen Rider: Prologue, Kamen Rider ZO and Kamen Rider J. After the original creator Shōtarō Ishinomori's death in 1998, the Kamen Rider franchise continued in 2000 with Kamen Rider Kuuga. As of 2022, thirty-three Kamen Rider series have been made, with the newest being Kamen Rider Geats which premiered in September 2022.

As of 2005, a remake of the Kamen Rider series was made and reimagined with Kamen Rider The First and continued with Kamen Rider The Next released in 2007.

The cultural impact of the series in Japan resulted in astronomer Akimasa Nakamura naming two minor planets in honor of the series: 12408 Fujioka, after actor Hiroshi Fujioka, known for his portrayal of Takeshi Hongo/Kamen Rider 1, and 12796 Kamenrider, after the series itself.

As of 2021, starting from Kamen Rider: Beyond Generations'', Hiroshi Fujioka's son, Maito portrays Takeshi Hongo's younger self.

References

External links
 Ishimori@Style - Shotaro Ishinomori on Ishimori Productions official website
 Kamen Rider series on Region 2 DVD - A complete list of all official releases to date.
 Toei Kyoto Studio Park - A theme park with official events, exhibitions and shops related to the Kamen Rider.
 

Kamen Rider
1970s Japanese television series
1971 Japanese television series debuts
1973 Japanese television series endings
Mainichi Broadcasting System original programming
TV Asahi original programming
Cyborgs in television
Human experimentation in fiction
Japanese superheroes
Japanese action television series
Television series about neo-Nazism
Television series about Nazis
Terrorism in television
Japanese horror fiction television series